The Fairview Public Schools are a community public school district that serves students in pre-kindergarten through eighth grade in Fairview, in Bergen County, New Jersey, United States.

As of the 2018–19 school year, the district, comprising three schools, had an enrollment of 1,507 students and 93.0 classroom teachers (on an FTE basis), for a student–teacher ratio of 16.2:1.

The district is classified by the New Jersey Department of Education as being in District Factor Group "A", the lowest of eight groupings. District Factor Groups organize districts statewide to allow comparison by common socioeconomic characteristics of the local districts. From lowest socioeconomic status to highest, the categories are A, B, CD, DE, FG, GH, I and J.

For ninth through twelfth grades, public school students from Fairview attend Cliffside Park High School in Cliffside Park as part of a sending/receiving relationship with the Cliffside Park School District. As of the 2018–19 school year, the high school had an enrollment of 1,196 students and 92.7 classroom teachers (on an FTE basis), for a student–teacher ratio of 12.9:1. The Fairview Board of Education appoints a representative to serve on the Board of the Cliffside Park district.

Schools 
Schools in the district (with 2018–19 enrollment data from the National Center for Education Statistics) are:
Elementary schools
Lincoln School Annex with 232 students in grades PreK-K
Veronica Scerbo, Principal
Number 3 School  (constructed in 1908) / Number Three School Annex with 546 students in grades K-3
Maria Kushi, Principal of Number Three School (Grades 2-3)
Lucille Juliano, Principal of Number Three School Annex (1st Grade)
Middle school
Lincoln School with 667 students in grades 5-8 (constructed in 1911)
Lea Turro, Principal

Administration
Core members of the district's administration are:
Dr. David Sleppin, Superintendent of Schools
John Bussanich, Board Secretary and Business Administrator

Board of education
The district's board of education has nine members who set policy and oversee the fiscal and educational operation of the district through its administration. As a Type II school district, the board's trustees are elected directly by voters to serve three-year terms of office on a staggered basis, with three seats up for election each year held in April; the district is one of 12 districts, out of more than 600 statewide, that still hold school elections in April. As one of the districts with school elections in April, voters decide on passage of the annual school budget.

References

External links 
District web site
 
School Data for the Fairview Public Schools, National Center for Education Statistics

Fairview, Bergen County, New Jersey
New Jersey District Factor Group A
School districts in Bergen County, New Jersey